Delphine Ledoux (born 15 May 1985 in Calais) is a French rhythmic gymnast. She is a nine-time French National All-around Champion.

Career 
She is the French National Champion for a national record of nine consecutive years (2004-2012).

Delphine took up gymnastics at age seven and started competing in 2002 for France, She did not compete at the 2003 World Championships due to injury. At the 2005, 2009 Mediterranean Games she won the silver medal in All-around.

At the 2011 International Tournament of Calais, Ledoux won the silver medal in All-around and gold in ball final. She had her highest placement at the 2011 World Championships finishing 12th in All-around. She won the bronze medal in hoop and ribbon at the 2011 Corbeil-Essonnes World Cup. She won the bronze medal in All-around and ribbon at the 2011 Sofia World Cup. She competed in the individual All-around event at the 2012 Summer Olympics, where she placed 13th in the qualifications. She retired after the Olympics.

References

External links
 
 
 
 

1985 births
Living people
French rhythmic gymnasts
Olympic gymnasts of France
Gymnasts at the 2012 Summer Olympics
Sportspeople from Calais
Mediterranean Games silver medalists for France
Competitors at the 2005 Mediterranean Games
Competitors at the 2009 Mediterranean Games
Mediterranean Games medalists in gymnastics
20th-century French women
21st-century French women